Cretan Revolt may refer to one of the following uprisings in Crete:

Under Venetian rule
Cretan Revolt (1212) of the Hagiostephanites family
Cretan Revolt (1217) of the Skordiles and Melissenos families
Cretan Revolt (1222) of the Melissenos family
Cretan Revolt (1230)
Revolt of the Chortatzes brothers (1272/73)
Revolt of Alexios Kallergis (1282–1299)
Revolt of Sfakia (1319)
Cretan Revolt (1332)
Cretan Revolt (1347)
Revolt of Saint Titus (1363–1368)
Conspiracy of Sifis Vlastos (1453–1454)
Revolt of George Kantanoleos (1570)

Under Ottoman rule
Daskalogiannis Revolt (1770)
Crete during the Greek War of Independence (1821–1828)
Cretan Revolt (1841)
Cretan Revolt (1858)
Cretan Revolt (1866–1869)
Cretan Revolt (1878)
Cretan Revolt (1897–1898), which led to the creation of the Cretan State

Under the Cretan State
 Theriso Revolt (1905)